The Noun River or Wad Noun is a river in Morocco and the southernmost permanent watercourse in the country. It is located 70 km north of the Draa River and flows southwest originating in the Anti-Atlas, passing south of Guelmim and meeting the Atlantic Ocean at Foum Asaca in the region of Sbouya.

See also
Guelmim
Sidi Ifni
Ifrane Atlas-Saghir
Draa River

References

Rivers of Morocco
Geography of Guelmim-Oued Noun